The Rey Fire was a wildfire that burned in the area southeast of Lake Cachuma in the range above the Santa Ynez River, Santa Barbara County, California in 2016. By the time the fire was contained, it had burned .

The fire
About 300 people were evacuated from their campsites and residences, and on Friday officials let up to 5 groups at a time retrieve personal belongings from their campsites. As of Monday morning, about 1200 firefighters were working on containing the blaze, as well as 11 aircraft. As of Monday morning, the fire has exploded to 23,546 acres and has increased back to 20% containment in 4 days and 14 hours, since it started.

The National Weather Service reported on Saturday that the fire had produced a pyrocloud. This mass of hot air resembles a thunderstorm cloud that can collapse when the air cools down. The wind can manifest as strong gusts at the surface which can exacerbate the fire.

On Sunday night, August 28th, the fire had charred 33,006 acres and was 54% contained, with very little, if not no growth overnight.

On September 16, the fire was fully contained, having burned

See also
2016 California wildfires

References

External links
 California wildfires on the US Forestry Incident Information System  (InciWeb)

2016 California wildfires
Wildfires in Santa Barbara County, California
Los Padres National Forest